Nicholas Odjer (born 3 May 1995) is a Ghanaian footballer who plays as a winger for Tema Youth SC.

Club career
Odjer started playing for youth side Mighty Eagles. He made his senior debuts for Tema Youth sc in 2012, aged only 16. Odjer Scored his first goal for Tema Youth when he came on as a substitute in a 1–1 draw with Wassaman in 2012. . Nicholas odjer is the senior brother of Moses Odjer who plays for Italian seria B side Salernitana.

References

1995 births
People from Tema
Living people
Ghanaian footballers
Association football midfielders
Tema Youth players